The Old Coast Road is a dirt road that still exists in part and preceded the current Big Sur Coast Highway along the northern coast of Big Sur, California. It was initially a trail created by Rumsen and Esselen Native Americans to travel along the coast in present-day Monterey County, California. Soon after the Spanish arrived, Governor Teodoro Gonzalez granted  land that included portions of the trail as Rancho San Jose y Sur Chiquito to  Marcelino Escobar in 1835. Governor Juan Alvarado re-granted the land to Escobar the same year. The Rancho included land from Carmel to near Palo Colorado Canyon. José Castro gained possession of the land in about 1848. He improved the trail from Monterey to Palo Colorado Canyon as early as 1853. A hand-drawn map created  accompanying the grant indicated a road or trail was already present along the coast.

Monterey County first declared it a public road in 1855. In 1886 Charles Bixby improved the road between his ranch and Monterey, and William Post extended it further south to his ranch. The condition of the road limited the shipment of goods. Steamers were used to pick up lime, tanbark, and other materials, and to transport heavy goods and supplies to residents at Notley's Landing, Partington Cove, and the mouth of the Big Sur River. In 1920, the  trip from Carmel in a light spring wagon pulled by two horses could be completed in about 11 hours. A lumber wagon pulled by four horses could make the trip in 13 hours. The road was impassable for most of each winter. Dr. John L. Roberts first proposed converting the wagon road into a highway in 1915. Opening the coast to visitors for recreational use in the early 1900s increased interest in improving access to the region. Construction of a paved highway was begun in 1921. Funding ran out and construction was restarted in 1928. The paved highway was opened in 1937. 

A  portion of the original Old Coast Road still exists. It is accessible to high-clearance vehicles from Highway 1 immediately north of the Bixby Creek Bridge. It crosses the river twice at the junction of its North and South forks, formerly the location of the Idlewild Resort from about 1900 to 1921. After another , the road enters a coastal redwood forest. After another , the road leaves the El Sur Ranch and climbs out of the canyon before descending steeply, rounding a number of blind curves and descending towards Andrew Molera State Park where it rejoins Highway 1.

Origins 

A trail along the coast was created by Rumsen and Esselen Native Americans who traveled along the coast in present-day Monterey County, California before the 1700s. On 14 September 1786, the two ships of explorer Jean La Pérouse expedition visited Mission San Carlos Borromeo de Carmelo. By this time, almost the entire indigenous population had been forced into laboring within the California mission system. He reported that, "The country of the Ecclemachs [Esselen] extends above 20 leagues to the eastward of Monterey."

Rancho San Jose y Sur Chiquito

Governor Juan Alvarado granted Rancho San José y Sur Chiquito comprising two square leagues of land in 1839 to Marcelino Escobar, Alcalde (or mayor) of Monterey. It included land from south of the Carmel River to the north side of Palo Colorado Canyon. It was named for two bodies of water: San José Creek near Point Lobos and El Río Chiquito del Sur.

Two of Escobar's sons, Juan and Agustin, obtained possession of the rancho shortly afterward, and sold it on August 26, 1841, to Doňa Maria Josefa de Abrego for about three cents an acre. She held power of attorney for her husband to buy and sell land. She paid $250, one-half in silver, and one-half in gold. She may have been acting for her husband, José Abrego. She later deeded the land to a group of about 10 Mexican soldiers at no cost, perhaps in payment of a gambling debt incurred by her husband. The soldiers in turn gave it to José Castro, their superior officer, in about 1848. Castro was former Governor Alvarado's brother-in-law. Castro improved on the existing primitive trail from Monterey to Palo Colorado Canyon as early as 1853, when he filed a map documenting the boundaries.

Rancho El Sur 

Maria Jerónima de la Encarnación Vallejo, the sister of Governor Mariano Guadalupe Vallejo, married Captain John B. R. Cooper in 1827. In 1834, Mexican Governor José Figueroa granted Rancho El Sur comprising two square leagues of land to Juan Bautista Alvarado.  Six years later, Alvarado traded ownership of Rancho El Sur with Cooper for the more accessible and readily farmed  Rancho Bolsa del Potrero y Moro Cojo south of present-day Castroville in the Salinas Valley. Rancho El Sur was partitioned into fifteen lots by 1892. Lots one through thirteen comprise the present-day El Sur Ranch. Lots 14 and 15 were owned by Frances and Andrew Molera, grandchildren of John B.R. Cooper. She later sold the land to The Nature Conservancy which in turn sold it to the state of California. It formed Andrew Molera State Park.

The first road through the rancho was extended from the trail through Rancho San Jose y Sur Chiquito by local residents. It then crossed the North and South Forks of the Little Sur River and then continued south to the Molera Ranch. Three years later the ranch owners extended it to Posts Summit.

After California gained statehood in 1850, the county declared the trail from Carmel to Mill Creek (present-day Bixby Creek) as a public road in 1855. But the California coast south of Carmel and north of San Simeon remained one of the most remote regions in the state, rivaling at the time nearly any other region in the United States for its difficult access. It remained largely an untouched wilderness until early in the twentieth century. When the region was first settled by European immigrants in 1853, it was the United States' "last frontier."

Bixby builds road 

When J.B.R. Cooper died, his wife and children inherited the land. The Cooper Ranch and the Molera Ranch were operated on the northern and southern portions of the Rancho. They used the road to transport cattle and products to and from Monterey. He harvested lumber, tanbark, and mined lime. Without a road, he resorted to using a tram, landing chute, and hoist to transfer the goods to ships anchored slightly offshore. Bixby tried to persuade the county to build a road to Bixby Creek, but they refused, replying that "no one would want to live there." In 1870, Bixby and his father hired men to improve the track and constructed the first wagon road including 23 bridges from the Carmel Mission to Bixby Creek.

Further south, the Rancho El Sur grant extended from the mouth of Little Sur River inland about 2.5 miles (4.0 km) over the coastal mountains and south along the coast past the mouth of the Big Sur River to Cooper's Point. It was largely a cattle operation. There was a brief industrial boom in southern Monterey County during the late 19th century, but the early decades of the twentieth century passed with few changes. Big Sur residents grew produce locally and raised cattle for markets in Monterey and the Salinas Valley. Most of the coast remained a nearly inaccessible wilderness. As late as the 1920s, only two homes in the entire region had electricity, locally generated by water wheels and windmills. Most of the population lived without power until connections to the California electric grid were established in the early 1950s. The region has always been relatively difficult to access and only the sturdiest and most self-sufficient settlers stayed.

Road improved 

In 1886 Charles Bixby partnered with W. B. Post and they improved and realigned what became known as the Old Coast Road south to Post's ranch near Sycamore Canyon. The road from Bixby climbed the steep Cerro Hill and crossed the Little Sur River where its two forks diverted before crossing the Cooper Ranch on the former Rancho El Sur. In 1920, the  trip from Carmel in a light spring wagon pulled by two horses could be completed in about 11 hours. A lumber wagon pulled by four horses could make the trip in 13 hours.

In 1891, visitor C. A. Canfield wrote about how a trip on the mail wagon to Posts took most of a day, where he remained the night. The next day he rode horseback south with Thomas B. Slate. They reached Slates Hot Springs at about 5pm. Due to the steep and narrow road, even during the summer Coast residents would receive supplies via boat from Monterey or San Francisco. The single-lane road was closed in winter when it became impassable. Due to the limited access, settlement was primarily concentrated near the Big Sur River and present-day Lucia, and individual settlements along a  stretch of coast between the two. The northern and southern regions of the coast were isolated from one another.

In 1897, Harold W. Fairbanks and Maynard Dixon traversed the coast over a two-week period. They wrote:

In 1900, the county improved the road south to the forks of the Little Sur River. Charles Howland, who drove the mail stage between Monterey and Big Sur, built the Idlewild Hotel in about 1900 on the Old Coast Road where it crossed the Little Sur River. The Pfeiffer family's hospitality was enjoyed by friends and strangers alike for years. They finally began charging guests in 1910, naming it Pfeiffer's Ranch Resort, and it became one of the earliest places to stay.

Recreation draws travelers 

In 1905, the Idlewild resort and campground on the Little Sur River advertised that visitors could take the 6 a.m. stage from the Everett House in Monterey on Mondays, Wednesdays, and Fridays. By 1909, their advertisements stated that the camp would be accessible by auto as soon as the "Cerro Grade", a stretch of road from the coast to the Little Sur River near Cerro Hill, was completed. In 1910, the Monterey Daily Cypress reported that Mr. and Mrs. A.E. [Abelardo Enos] Cooper "motored down to Mrs. Martha M. Cooper ranch at Sur, leaving Monterey at 12 midnight and arriving there at 2 a.m." J. Smeaton Chase, who traveled on horseback up the coast in 1911, reported that a stage coach carried passengers from Posts (then named Arbolado) to Monterey on alternate days. But the road was still very rough and most goods including cheese produced on the Cooper Ranch were shipped by boat to Monterey.

The Idlewild competed with the Pfeiffer Resort for guests through about 1920, when the Idlewild was forced out of business by Martha Cooper, who acquired the land. In 1920, the  trip from Carmel in a light spring wagon pulled by two horses could be completed in about 11 hours. A lumber wagon pulled by four horses could make the trip in 13 hours.

Current road 

In July 1937, the California Highways and Public Works department described the journey prior to the construction of the newly opened road. "There was a narrow, winding, steep road from Carmel south ... approximately 35 miles to the Big Sur River. From that point south to San Simeon, it could only be traveled by horseback or on foot."

A paved  section of the road two-lane highway from Carmel River in the north to Anderson Canyon south of McWay Falls was opened in December 1932. The remainder of the route to San Carpóforo Creek near San Simeon in the south was opened on June 17, 1937. It replaced the Old Coast Road, with the exception of a section inland of the current Bixby Creek Bridge. That inland section of road still exists, allowing residents access to their homes and land.

The remaining  portion of the original Old Coast Road connects on the north end to Highway 1 immediately north of the Bixby Creek Bridge. Most of the land on either side of the county road is privately owned. Trespassing, hunting, camping, or fires are not permitted at any time. From Bixby Creek Bridge, the route descends about  into Bixby Canyon. The ranch strictly enforces the no trespassing signs. Individuals who trespass on the ranch's land have been cited.

After entering the El Sur Ranch, the road descends sharply into the Little Sur River canyon. It crosses the river twice at the junction of its North and South forks, formerly the location of the Idlewild Resort from about 1900 to 1921. After another , the road enters a coastal redwood forest. After another , the road leaves the El Sur Ranch and climbs out of the canyon before descending steeply, rounding a number of blind curves and descending towards Andrew Molera State Park where it rejoins Highway 1.

The dirt road may be impassable and closed during wet weather. When passable, the drive takes about one hour. There are several severe switchbacks, blind curves, and few pullouts or places to turn around. A high-clearance all wheel or four-wheel drive vehicle is recommended.

Trails 

There is no parking available at the trailhead. , the trailhead is closed due to the closure of the Palo Colorado Canyon Road.

Faults 

Earthquake faults can be difficult to identify in Big Sur because of overlying rock formations, landslide deposits, and vegetation. A large fault crosses Highway 1 at Hurricane Point.

Coast Ridge Road 

The southern region of Monterey County coast was isolated from the few settlements in the north by the steep and rugged terrain. To the south of Posts, there was no road beyond the Pfeiffer Resort and Ranch, only a foot and horseback trail. During the 18th century, the trail began at the Old Post Ranch and climbed inland to the crest of the coastal ridge. To avoid the steep canyons along the coast, the trail followed the coastal ridge over Anderson Peak and Cone Peak to locations in the south, including  homesteads at Slates Hot Springs, the Harlan and Dani families at Lucia, the mining town of Manchester, and the Plaskett family near what is now known as Gorda. The southern homesteaders were more closely tied to the people in the interior San Antonio Valley, including Jolon and Lockwood, than to the coastal communities in the vicinity of the Big Sur River, who were connected with Monterey to the north. A horse trail connected several trails originating on the coast of the southern region of Big Sur over the Santa Lucia Range through present-day Fort Hunter Liggett to Jolon in the San Antonio Valley.

Segments of the Coast Ridge Road have been given new names. The trail from the Ventana Inn to Cone Peak is known as North Coast Ridge Trail. Another portion north of the Nacimento-Fergusson Road is now known as the Coast Ridge Road and Forest Service Route 22S05. To the south of the Nacimento-Fergusson Road, the route is named the South Coast Ridge Road (Forest Service route 20S05). When open, the dirt road is only suitable for high-clearance four-wheel drive vehicles. It is sometimes known as the Coast Ridge Trail. It connects to the Plaskett Ridge Road. In January, 2020, the US Forest Service closed the Nacimento-Fergusson Road due to extensive slides, debris flows and road failures. The Old Coast Road and the Coast Ridge Road are often impassable during and after winter storms.

The northern beginning of the current trail is only accessible on foot from near the Ventana Inn.

References 

Big Sur